Colleen Ann McClung is an American chronobiologist and neuroscientist. She is a professor at the University of Pittsburgh and a fellow of the American College of Neuropsychopharmacology.

Education and career 
In 1990, McClung began her undergraduate studies at the University of North Carolina at Chapel Hill, graduating in 1994 with a major in Biology and a minor in Chemistry. In the year of 1995, McClung became a student at the graduate department of the University of Virginia, and in 2001 she received a PhD in Biology from the same institution. In 2001, McClung started her postdoctoral work in the University of Texas Southwestern Medical Center working with Eric J. Nestler; she remained there until 2003 when she became an instructor in the department of psychiatry at University of Texas Southwestern Medical Center. From 2005 until 2011, she was an assistant professor at the same department. In 2011, McClung became an associate professor at the Psychiatry Department at the University of Pittsburgh Medical School. In 2017, she was promoted to professor.

Research 
McClung's research focuses on discovering, analyzing and studying the molecular and biological mechanisms of diseases such as drug addiction, schizophrenia, major depression and bipolar disorder, with a primary interest in understanding their association with circadian rhythms. During her Ph.D. McClung worked on the use of the fruitfly Drosophila melanogaster as a model system to study the genetics of drugs sensitization. McClung went on to study the relationship of circadian rhythms with the development of psychiatric disorders. McClung has also used microarray technologies to examine gene expression changes in the mouse brain in the context of psychiatric disorders, specially addiction. Her work on disrupting clock genes in mice and has lead mice to develop bipolar disorder, and shown how circadian rhythms can control moods in people.

Awards and honors 
In 2015 McClung was elected a fellow of the American College of Neuropsychopharmacology Fellow (2015). In 2021 she received the Colvin Prizewinner for Outstanding Achievement in Mood Disorder Research from the Brain & Behavior Research Foundation.

Selected publications

References

External links 
 

Living people
University of North Carolina at Chapel Hill alumni
University of Virginia alumni
University of Pittsburgh faculty
American women neuroscientists
Chronobiologists